South Michigan Street Historic District is a national historic district located at South Bend, St. Joseph County, Indiana.  It encompasses nine contributing buildings on a commercial strip in South Bend. It developed between about 1911 and 1945, and includes notable examples of Classical Revival style architecture.  The buildings are primarily two-story, brick commercial buildings, some with stone or terra cotta trim.  They include the former Smith-Alsop Paint Store Building (1922), Myer-Seeberger Building (1916), Whitmer-McNeese Building (1928), and LaSalle Paper Company Building (1925).

It was listed on the National Register of Historic Places in 1997.

References

Historic districts on the National Register of Historic Places in Indiana
Commercial buildings on the National Register of Historic Places in Indiana
Neoclassical architecture in Indiana
Historic districts in South Bend, Indiana
National Register of Historic Places in St. Joseph County, Indiana